Parot is a Spanish police thriller television series starring Adriana Ugarte, Blanca Portillo and Iván Massagué, among others. It was originally released on Amazon Prime Video on 28 May 2021, with a later free-to-air broadcasting date by RTVE yet to be disclosed.

Premise 
Set in 2013 in Spain, the fiction follows the serial killing of former inmates who have been early released after the annulment of the Parot doctrine reduced their terms of imprisonment. The investigation of the criminal case is assumed by agent Isabel Mora (Adriana Ugarte).

Cast 
 Adriana Ugarte as Isabel Mora.
 Blanca Portillo as Andrea Llanes.
 Iván Massagué as Haro.
 Patricia Vico as Ana Hurtado.
  as Jorge Nieto.
 Antonio Dechent el comisario.
 Michel Brown as Plaza.
  as Sol.
 Marcos Marín as Abaño.
 Rodrigo Poison as Perea.
 Nacho Fresneda as Patas.
 Max Mariegues as Basauri.

Production and release 
Created by Pilar Nadal, Alonso Laporta, Luis Murillo Arias and Luis Murillo Moreno and directed by Gustavo Ron and Rafael Montesinos, the series was produced by ViacomCBS International Studios, RTVE and Onza. It consists of 10 episodes with a running time of around 45 minutes. Filming started by September 2020 in Madrid. On 25 March 2021, Amazon Prime Video reported the intended release date set for 28 May 2021. Paramount+ released the series in Latin American territories on 20 August 2021.

Episodes

References 

2021 Spanish television series debuts
2021 Spanish television series endings
2020s Spanish drama television series
2020s crime drama television series
Spanish thriller television series
Spanish-language television shows
Television shows filmed in Spain
Television series set in 2013
Television shows set in Spain
Spanish crime television series
Spanish-language Amazon Prime Video original programming
Television series by Onza